Roberto Losada Rodríguez (born 25 October 1976) is a former Spanish-born Hong Kong professional footballer who played as a forward. He is currently the head coach of Hong Kong Premier League club Eastern.

Over seven seasons, he amassed La Liga totals of 113 games and 27 goals, almost all with Real Oviedo. He also appeared in 124 Segunda División matches (16 goals), and spent two years in Hong Kong with Kitchee.

Club career
Losada was born in Vigo, Province of Pontevedra. Nicknamed El Chino due his facial features, he made his professional debut for Real Oviedo at just 18, as the club was also in La Liga; after two season-long loans, at CD Toledo and RCD Mallorca (the former in the Segunda División), he returned, going on to be an important attacking member– although mostly as a backup – as the Asturian team would eventually drop two tiers in just four years due to financial irregularities.

Losada left in the 2003–04 campaign to Real Valladolid in the top flight, equalling a career-best eight goals but again being relegated. After years of intermittent use, he left in January 2007 to another side in the second division, UD Las Palmas, not managing to score in his five-month spell.

In the summer of 2007, Losada returned to his native Galicia and signed with CD Lugo of Segunda División B. After three years, aged nearly 34, he had his first abroad experience, joining Hong Kong club Kitchee and helping it win the national championship in his first season after 47 years. At the end of the campaign, he was also named Hong Kong Footballer of the Year and MVP, making the competition's Best Eleven.

Losada was made Kitchee's captain for 2011–12, replacing Lo Kwan Yee. He announced his retirement on 26 May 2012 at nearly 36 years of age, after netting the 3–3 equaliser in stoppage time of extra time in the FA Cup final against Pegasus, which his team won.

International career
Uncapped by Spain at any level, Losada played three games for the unofficial Galicia team. On 27 December 2008, he scored the deciding goal in a 3–2 win over Iran at the Estadio Riazor.

Coaching career
Losada immediately joined the club's coaching staff, being named his compatriot Josep Gombau's assistant. He retained his post under the latter's successor Àlex Gómez, only leaving on 8 September 2020.

On 16 October 2020, Losada signed with Eastern in the same capacity. He became their head coach the following year.

Honours
Valladolid
Segunda División: 2006–07

Kitchee
Hong Kong First Division League: 2010–11, 2011–12
Hong Kong FA Cup: 2011–12
Hong Kong League Cup: 2011–12

Individual
Hong Kong Footballer of the Year: 2010–11
Team of the Season: 2010–11
Hong Kong Most Popular Player: 2010–11

References

External links

1976 births
Living people
Spanish footballers
Footballers from Vigo
Association football forwards
La Liga players
Segunda División players
Segunda División B players
Tercera División players
Real Oviedo Vetusta players
Real Oviedo players
CD Toledo players
RCD Mallorca players
Real Valladolid players
UD Las Palmas players
CD Lugo players
Hong Kong First Division League players
Kitchee SC players
Tai Chung FC players
Resources Capital FC players
Spanish expatriate footballers
Expatriate footballers in Hong Kong
Spanish expatriate sportspeople in Hong Kong
Spanish football managers
Hong Kong football managers
Expatriate football managers in Hong Kong